Digital Data Systems, or DDS, was a consultancy firm specializing in operations support systems (OSS) and business support systems (BSS) in the public switched telephone network (PSTN) and carrier marketplace within the telecommunications industry. DDS was an independent provider of OSS and BSS during a time when such systems were provided by the large telecommunications switch vendors. It completed in OSS / BSS head-to-head against AT&T, Northern Telecom (now Nortel Networks), and others in providing services that sold and deployed amongst the Regional Bell Operating Companies, including: Bell Atlantic, Southwestern Bell, and Pacific Telesis.  It had a hardware joint venture with MIPS Computer Systems who provided the hardware platform upon which it ran. The business was acquired by Computer Sciences Corporation (CSC) in 1992.

Products and Services
In addition to consulting services, the Company had two products: MATCH and DETECT.

MATCH
The Match product provided automated systems for telephone companies in Operations, administration and management (OA&M) to migrate telephone services delivered by existings analogue AT&T 1AESS switches to newer digital switches, such as Northern Telecom's DMS-100 or AT&T's 5ESS switches. The MATCH was composed of three main system components: Decoding, Matching, and Provisioning. The Decoding module would decode core memory dumps from the AT&T 1AESS, 5AESS, Nortel DMS-100, and operating databases including COSMOS and TIRKS.  Network inventory, services, and related constructs would be stored in a proprietary MATCH universal database management system, which was configurable based on job and customer preferences. The Matching module would compare two populated databases, being a source and target, and compute the functional transform required to bring the target system in line with the source. The Provisioning model examined the transform function and generated the necessary AT&T 5AESS recent change messages and DMS-100 service updates to reproduce telephony services provided by the old switch on the new switching platform.

DETECT
The DETECT product utilized the Decoding and Matching modules of the MATCH product and brought in data records from RBOC telecommunications billing systems. Given the manual nature of service provisioning through the RCMAC at the time, many services were provisioned-but-unbilled by RBOCs. DETECT would identify provisioned-but-unbilled services and optionally generate the necessary machine instructions to recapture leaking revenue. The DETECT product detected over multi-million in revenue leakage often found in large centrex groups of multinational corporations.

See also
MIPS Technologies
Computer Sciences Corporation
1AESS Analogue-to-Digital replacement program of the 1980s and 1990s

References

External links
TeleManagement Forum
OSS News Review
Pipeline Magazine
 InsideTelephony OSS/BSS
Billing & OSS World
OSS Line

Telephony
Telecommunications systems
Network management
Software companies based in Virginia
Business software
Defunct software companies of the United States
1992 mergers and acquisitions